Mirror Flower, Water Moon, is an East Asian proverb/phrase (a Chengyu and a Yojijukugo), meaning something that can be seen but not touched, like a flower reflected in a mirror or the moon reflected on the water's surface; something that is beautiful but unattainable dreams, a mirage. It can also mean something that seems so tangible and simple but reflects a much deeper meaning.

This name references , which is the shorter form of a Chinese idiom (or chéngyǔ), literally meaning a "flower seen in the mirror, moon on the water's surface".

See also
 Flowers of the Four Seasons
 Four Gentlemen
 Smoke and mirrors
 Three Friends of Winter
 Four Treasures of the Study

Chinese proverbs
East Asian culture
Japanese proverbs